The 2016 Aegon International was a women's tennis tournament played on outdoor grass courts. It was the 42nd edition of the event, and a WTA Premier tournament on the 2016 WTA Tour. The event took place at the Devonshire Park Lawn Tennis Club in Eastbourne, United Kingdom from 19 June through 25 June 2016.

Points and prize money

Point distribution

Prize money

Singles main-draw entrants

Seeds

 1 Rankings are as of 13 June 2016.

Other entrants
The following players received wildcards into the main draw:
 Naomi Broady
 Tara Moore

The following players received entry from the qualifying draw:
 Kateryna Bondarenko
 Madison Brengle
 Polona Hercog
 Ana Konjuh
 Varvara Lepchenko
 Mirjana Lučić-Baroni
 Monica Puig
 Alison Van Uytvanck

The following players received entry as lucky losers:
 Denisa Allertová
 Anett Kontaveit
 Zhang Shuai
 Zheng Saisai

Withdrawals
Before the tournament
  Annika Beck → replaced by  Tímea Babos
  Madison Keys → replaced by  Anett Kontaveit
  Monica Niculescu → replaced by  Anna-Lena Friedsam
  Laura Siegemund → replaced by  Zhang Shuai
  Sloane Stephens → replaced by  Alizé Cornet
  Barbora Strýcová → replaced by  Denisa Allertová
  CoCo Vandeweghe → replaced by  Zheng Saisai

Doubles main-draw entrants

Seeds

1 Rankings are as of 13 June 2016.

Other entrants
The following pairs received wildcards into the doubles main draw:
  Naomi Broady /  Heather Watson
  Svetlana Kuznetsova /  Roberta Vinci
  Lucie Šafářová /  Samantha Stosur

Champions

Singles

  Dominika Cibulková def.  Karolína Plíšková 7–5, 6–3

Doubles

  Darija Jurak /  Anastasia Rodionova def.  Chan Hao-ching /  Chan Yung-jan 5–7, 7–6(7–4), [10–6]

References

External links
 Website

2016 in English tennis
2016 WTA Tour
2015
June 2016 sports events in the United Kingdom